Science and technology in Flanders, being the Flemish Community  and more specifically the northern region of Belgium (Europe), is well developed with the presence of several universities and research institutes. These are strongly spread over all Flemish cities, from Kortrijk and Bruges in the Western side, over Ghent as a major university center alongside Antwerp, Brussels and Leuven to Hasselt and Diepenbeek in the Eastern side.

Institutes of higher education in the Flemish community

Universities 
Six Flemish universities issue academic bachelor, master and doctoral degrees on a broad range of disciplines:
 University of Antwerp ('UA'), Antwerp
 Hogeschool-Universiteit Brussel ('HUB'), Brussels (former Katholieke Universiteit Brussel)
 Vrije Universiteit Brussel, ('VUB') Brussels
 Ghent University ('UGent'), Ghent
 Hasselt University, Hasselt
 KU Leuven, Leuven and Katholieke Universiteit Leuven Campus Kortrijk, Kortrijk

As a result of an international treaty between the Netherlands and Flanders, a co-operation between the Universiteit Hasselt (Flanders) and the Maastricht University (the Netherlands) is recognised as the
 Transnational University Limburg, Hasselt

According to the Webometrics Ranking of World Universities and the THES - QS World University Rankings, four Flemish universities (Universiteit Antwerpen, Vrije Universiteit Brussel, Universiteit Gent and Katholieke Universiteit Leuven) are among the top-150 universities in Europe and top-300 universities worldwide.

University colleges 
All recognised Flemish university colleges are associated with a Flemish university.
The following colleges, which issue professional bachelor, academic bachelor's and master's degrees, are recognised by the Flemish government:

Antwerp University Association: University Colleges associated with the University of Antwerp
 Artesis Hogeschool Antwerpen (Antwerp, Merksem, Lier, Mechelen, Turnhout), public
 Hogere Zeevaartschool Antwerpen (Antwerp), public
 Karel de Grote-Hogeschool (Antwerp), catholic
 Plantijn Hogeschool (Antwerpen, Boom), public

Ghent University Association: University Colleges associated with Ghent University
 Arteveldehogeschool (Ghent), catholic
 Hogeschool Gent (Ghent, Aalst, Melle), public
 Hogeschool West-Vlaanderen (Bruges, Kortrijk), public

University Association Brussels: University Colleges associated with Vrije Universiteit Brussel
 Erasmushogeschool Brussel (Brussels), public

KU Leuven Association: University Colleges associated with Katholieke Universiteit Leuven
 Groep T Hogeschool (Leuven), catholic
 Hogeschool-Universiteit Brussel (Brussels), catholic
 Hogeschool Sint-Lukas Brussel (Brussels), catholic
 Hogeschool voor Kunsten en Architectuur (Brussels, Ghent, Leuven, Genk), catholic
 Katholieke Hogeschool Brugge-Oostende (Bruges, Ostend), catholic
 Katholieke Hogeschool Kempen (Geel, Lier, Turnhout, Vorselaar), catholic
 Katholieke Hogeschool Leuven (Leuven, Diest), catholic
 Katholieke Hogeschool Limburg (Diepenbeek, Hasselt, Genk), catholic
 Katholieke Hogeschool Mechelen (Mechelen), catholic
 Katholieke Hogeschool Sint-Lieven (Ghent, Aalst, Sint-Niklaas), catholic
 Katholieke Hogeschool Zuid-West-Vlaanderen, (Kortrijk, Roeselare, Tielt, Torhout), catholic
 Lessius Hogeschool (Antwerp, Sint-Katelijne-Waver), catholic

Limburg University Association: University Colleges associated with Hasselt University
 Provinciale Hogeschool Limburg (Hasselt, Diepenbeek), public
 XIOS Hogeschool Limburg (Diepenbeek, Hasselt), public

Registered institutes of higher education 
Finally, the Flemish government has recognised a number of "registered" institutes of higher education, which mostly issue specialised degrees or provide education mainly in a foreign language:
 College of Europe (Bruges): postgraduate degree in European studies
 Continental Theological Seminary (Sint-Pieters-Leeuw)
 Evangelical Theological Faculty (Leuven): BA, MA and PhD studies on theology
 Brussels Faculty for Protestant Theology (Brussels): BA, MA and PhD studies on theology
 Flanders Business School (Antwerp)
 Prince Leopold Institute of Tropical Medicine (Antwerp), postgraduate degrees taught in French and English
 Vesalius College (Brussels)
 Vlerick Leuven Gent Management School (Leuven, Ghent): MBA and other management degrees taught in English and Dutch.

Technology funding
The following institutions provide various forms of public funding for research and development:
Institute for the promotion of Innovation by Science and Technology (IWT)
Flemish Council for Science Policy (VRWB)

Technology institutes
Flanders is home to several science and technology institutes.
Interuniversity Microelectronics Centre (IMEC)
Flanders District of Creativity (Flanders DC)
Flanders DRIVE
Flanders Institute for Logistics (VIL)
Flanders' Mechatronics Technology Centre (FMTC)
Flanders Multimedia Valley
Flemish Innovation Center for Graphic Communication
Interdisciplinary institute for BroadBand Technology (IBBT)
Flanders Interuniversity Institute of Biotechnology (VIB)
Flemish Institute for Technological Research (VITO)
Technopolis
Von Karman Institute for Fluid Dynamics
Instituut voor Tropische Geneeskunde

Science parks
Several science parks associated with the universities are spread over Flanders:
Arenberg Research-Park
Greenbridge science park
Haasrode Research-Park
Innotek
Limburg Science Park
Waterfront Researchpark
Zwijnaarde science park

See also
 Science and technology in Belgium
 Science and technology in the Brussels-Capital Region
 Science and technology in Wallonia
 Belgian Federal Science Policy Office (BELSPO)
 Economy of Belgium
 Agoria
 FlandersBio
 Ghent Bio-Energy Valley
 Science Parks of Wallonia

References

External links 
 Flemish Science Policy Council
 Presentation of R&D policies in Belgium (European Commission website, ERAWATCH)
 Presentation of innovation policies in Belgium (European Commission website, ProInno TrendChart for Innovation)
 Flanders' Mechatronics Technology Centre

Flanders
Science and technology in Belgium
Economy of Belgium